Silene sennenii is a species of plant in the family Caryophyllaceae. It is endemic to Spain.  Its natural habitat is Mediterranean Matorral shrubland vegetation. It is threatened by habitat loss.

References

sennenii
Endemic flora of Spain
Endemic flora of the Iberian Peninsula
Matorral shrubland
Endangered plants
Taxonomy articles created by Polbot
Plants described in 1905